St Georges Park was an association football stadium in Newport on the Isle of Wight. It was home to Newport (IOW) F.C. and the Isle of Wight official football team, which represents Isle of Wight at the bi-annual island games.

The record attendance at the stadium is 3,112 in a pre-season friendly match against Portsmouth F.C. in 2008.

Newport IW FC left St Georges Park in 2018, currently they have been ground sharing with other Isle of Wight teams, however the club were due to be relocating to a new purpose built sports stadium 'Wightfibre Park' in August 2022, however this never materialised. Plans for the new stadium consisted of a new club house and seated stand, capacity of 150, as well as three sheltered standing stands with a total capacity of 500 to 1000 people. 

Football venues in England
Sports venues on the Isle of Wight
Football on the Isle of Wight
Newport, Isle of Wight
1888 establishments in England
Sports venues completed in 1888
Newport (IOW) F.C.